Kirsi is a Finnish female given name. Its nameday is celebrated on 24 July. It began to be used in the 1940s, and it reached its peak of popularity in the 1960s and 1970s. As of 2013 there are 23,000 women with this name in Finland.

Origin and variants
The name Kirsi originated as a short form of Kristiina, Finnish version of Christina or Kirsikka which means cherry in Finnish. It also means frost in Finnish.

Notable people
Notable people with this name include:
Kirsi Ahonen (born 1976), Finnish javelin thrower
Kirsi Boström (born 1968), Finnish orienteer 
Kirsi Hänninen (born 1976), Finnish ice hockey player
Kirsi Heikkinen (born 1978), Finnish football referee
Kirsi Helen (born 1982), Finnish cross-country skier 
Kirsi Kunnas (1924 - 2021), Finnish poet
Kirsi Lampinen (born 1972), Finnish tennis player
Kirsi Mykkänen (born 1978), Finnish sprinter
Kirsi Ojansuu (born 1963), Finnish politician 
Kirsi Peltonen, Finnish mathematician
Kirsi Perälä (born 1982), Finnish cross-country skier 
Kirsi Piha (born 1967), Finnish politician
Kirsi Rauta (born 1962), Finnish marathon runner
Kirsi Välimaa (born 1978), Finnish cross country skier 
Kirsi Viilonen (better known as Kikka, 1964–2005), Finnish singer
Kirsi Ylijoki (born 1969), Finnish actress

References

Feminine given names
Finnish feminine given names